The 2009 Orix Buffaloes season features the Buffaloes quest to win their first Pacific League title under their current franchise configuration.

Regular season

Standings

Game log

|-align="center" bgcolor="#ffbbbb"
| 1 || April 3 || @Hawks || 8 - 0 || Wada (1-0) || Komatsu (0-1) ||  || 30,106 || 0-1-0
|-align="center" bgcolor="bbffbb"
| 2 || April 4 || @Hawks || 2 - 5 || Kondo (1-0) || Oba (0-1) || Kato (1) || 28,827 || 1-1-0
|-align="center" bgcolor="#ffbbbb"
| 3 || April 5 || @Hawks || 2 - 1 (10) || Kamiuchi (1-0) || Kawagoe (0-1) ||  || 29,576 || 1-2-0
|-align="center" bgcolor="#ffbbbb"
| 4 || April 7 || @Lions || 8 - 3 || Kishi (1-0) || Kaneko (0-1) ||  || 24,011 || 1-3-0
|-align="center" bgcolor="bbffbb"
| 5 || April 8 || @Lions || 2 - 10 || Yamamoto (1-0) || Ishii (0-1) ||  || 10,001 || 2-3-0
|-align="center" bgcolor="#ffbbbb"
| 6 || April 9 || @Lions || 13 - 6 || Nishiguchi (1-0) || Hirano (0-1) ||  || 9,813 || 2-4-0
|-align="center" bgcolor="bbffbb"
| 7 || April 10 || Marines || 10 - 8 || Katsuki (1-0) || Shimizu (0-2) ||  || 27,827 || 3-4-0
|-align="center" bgcolor="bbffbb"
| 8 || April 11 || Marines || 5 - 2 || Kondo (2-0) || Kobayashi (0-1) || Kato (2) || 30,444 || 4-4-0
|-align="center" bgcolor="bbffbb"
| 9 || April 12 || Marines || 4 - 1 || Kishida (1-0) || Ono (0-1) || Kato (3) || 31,597 || 5-4-0
|-align="center" bgcolor="bbffbb"
| 10 || April 14 || @Fighters || 7 - 8 || Kaneko (1-1) || Tadano (1-1) || Kato (4) || 17,548 || 6-4-0
|-align="center" bgcolor="#ffbbbb"
| 11 || April 15 || @Fighters || 11 - 5 || Kikuchi (1-0) || Motoyanagi (0-1) ||  || 17,579 || 6-5-0
|-align="center" bgcolor="#ffbbbb"
| 12 || April 16 || @Fighters || 7 - 1 || Takeda (1-0) || Nakayama (0-1) ||  || 20,702 || 6-6-0
|-align="center" bgcolor="#ffbbbb"
| 13 || April 18 || Eagles || 0 - 7 || Iwakuma (2-1) || Kondo (2-1) ||  || 20,598 || 6-7-0
|-align="center" bgcolor="bbffbb"
| 14 || April 19 || Eagles || 15 - 0 || Kishida (2-0) || Rasner (1-1) ||  || 21,561 || 7-7-0
|-align="center" bgcolor="#ffbbbb"
| 15 || April 21 || Lions || 1 - 7 || Kishi (3-0) || Kaneko (1-2) ||  || 10,326 || 7-8-0
|-align="center" bgcolor="bbffbb"
| 16 || April 22 || Lions || 6 - 3 || Yamamoto (2-0) || Ishii (0-2) ||  || 10,805 || 8-8-0
|-align="center" bgcolor="bbffbb"
| 17 || April 23 || Lions || 2 - 1 || Kato (1-0) || Onuma (0-1) ||  || 10,586 || 9-8-0
|-align="center" bgcolor="#ffbbbb"
| 18 || April 24 || Fighters || 0 - 11 || Darvish (3-1) || Komatsu (0-2) ||  || 18,724 || 9-9-0
|-align="center" bgcolor="#bbbbbb"
| — || April 25 || Fighters || colspan=6|Postponed (rained out)
|-align="center" bgcolor="bbffbb"
| 19 || April 26 || Fighters || 11 - 3 || Kishida (3-0) || Sakakibara (0-1) ||  || 13,223 || 10-9-0
|-align="center" bgcolor="bbffbb"
| 20 || April 28 || @Marines || 3 - 4 || Kato (2-0) || Sikorski (2-2) ||  || 13,198 || 11-9-0
|-align="center" bgcolor="bbffbb"
| 21 || April 29 || @Marines || 3 - 5 || Kaneko (2-2) || Watanabe (0-3) || Kato (5) || 24,756 || 12-9-0
|-align="center" bgcolor="#ffbbbb"
| 22 || April 30 || @Marines || 5 - 2 || Ito (1-1) || Kikuchihara (0-1) ||  || 12,212 || 12-10-0
|-

|-align="center" bgcolor="#ffbbbb"
| 23 || May 1 || @Eagles || 12 - 2 || Nagai (3-0) || Nakayama (0-2) ||  || 12,262 || 12-11-0
|-align="center" bgcolor="#ffbbbb"
| 24 || May 2 || @Eagles || 7 - 3 || Iwakuma (3-1) || Komatsu (0-3) ||  || 20,246 || 12-12-0
|-align="center" bgcolor="#ffbbbb"
| 25 || May 3 || @Eagles || 8 - 4 || Koyama (1-1) || Kishida (3-1) ||  || 20,619 || 12-13-0
|-align="center" bgcolor="bbffbb"
| 26 || May 4 || Hawks || 8 - 5 || Kondo (3-1) || Loe (0-4) || Kato (6) || 30,252 || 13-13-0
|-align="center" bgcolor="bbffbb"
| 27 || May 5 || Hawks || 2 - 1 || Kaneko (3-2) || Houlton (2-2) ||  || 31,639 || 14-13-0
|-align="center" bgcolor="#ffbbbb"
| 28 || May 6 || Hawks || 1 - 5 || Otonari (1-2) || Yamamoto (2-1) ||  || 30,960 || 14-14-0
|-align="center" bgcolor="#ffbbbb"
| 29 || May 8 || @Fighters || 10 - 1 || Darvish (4-1) || Nakayama (0-3) ||  || 26,638 || 14-15-0
|-align="center" bgcolor="#ffbbbb"
| 30 || May 9 || @Fighters || 3 - 2 || Fujii (2-1) || Komatsu (0-4) || Takeda (7) || 26,308 || 14-16-0
|-align="center" bgcolor="#ffbbbb"
| 31 || May 10 || @Fighters || 7 - 2 || Takeda (2-1) || Yoshino (0-1) ||  || 28,156 || 14-17-0
|-align="center" bgcolor="#ffbbbb"
| 32 || May 12 || Lions || 5 - 6 || Kishi (6-0) || Kondo (3-2) || Onodera (2) || 10,502 || 14-18-0
|-align="center" bgcolor="#ffbbbb"
| 33 || May 13 || Lions || 3 - 8 || Ishii (2-3) || Yamamoto (2-2) ||  || 10,454 || 14-19-0
|-align="center" bgcolor="#ffbbbb"
| 34 || May 14 || Lions || 1 - 3 || Nishiguchi (3-1) || Kaneko (3-3) || Onodera (3) || 10,229 || 14-20-0
|-align="center" bgcolor="#ffbbbb"
| 35 || May 15 || Fighters || 2 - 4 || Darvish (5-1) || Nakayama (0-4) || Takeda (8) || 11,405 || 14-21-0
|-align="center" bgcolor="#ffbbbb"
| 36 || May 16 || Fighters || 3 - 7 || Fujii (3-1) || Komatsu (0-5) || Takeda (9) || 21,965 || 14-22-0
|-align="center" bgcolor="bbffbb"
| 37 || May 17 || Fighters || 6 - 0 || Mitsuhara (1-0) || Takeda (2-2) ||  || 19,467 || 15-22-0
|-align="center" bgcolor="#ffbbbb"
| 38 || May 19 || Carp || 1 - 9 || Otake (3-1) || Kondo (3-3) ||  || 9,887 || 15-23-0
|-align="center" bgcolor="bbffbb"
| 39 || May 20 || Carp || 10 - 3 || Yamamoto (3-2) || Maeda (2-5) ||  || 11,107 || 16-23-0
|-align="center" bgcolor="bbffbb"
| 40 || May 22 || Tigers || 8 - 3 || Kaneko (4-3) || Ando (3-3) || Kato (7) || 23,433 || 17-23-0
|-align="center" bgcolor="#ffbbbb"
| 41 || May 23 || Tigers || 3 - 7 || Atchison (3-1) || Vogelsong (0-1) ||  || 28,031 || 17-24-0
|-align="center" bgcolor="bbffbb"
| 42 || May 24 || @Giants || 6 - 8 || Hirano (1-1) || Tono (2-3) ||  || 42,110 || 18-24-0
|-align="center" bgcolor="#ffbbbb"
| 43 || May 25 || @Giants || 6 - 2 || Takahashi (3-1) || Kondo (3-4) ||  || 40,057 || 18-25-0
|-align="center" bgcolor="#ffbbbb"
| 44 || May 27 || @Swallows || 5 - 4 || Matsuoka (3-0) || Katsuki (1-1) || Lim (15) || 12,014 || 18-26-0
|-align="center" bgcolor="#ffbbbb"
| 45 || May 28 || @Swallows || 4 - 0 || Tateyama (6-0) || Mitsuhara (1-1) ||  || 7,348 || 18-27-0
|-align="center" bgcolor="bbffbb"
| 46 || May 30 || BayStars || 6 - 4 || Kaneko (5-3) || Glynn (2-6) || Kato (8) || 11,217 || 19-27-0
|-align="center" bgcolor="bbffbb"
| 47 || May 31 || BayStars || 3 - 0 || Hirano (2-1) || Kobayashi (1-5) ||  || 14,857 || 20-27-0
|-

|-
| 48 || June 2 || Dragons ||  ||  ||  ||  ||  || 
|-
| 49 || June 3 || Dragons ||  ||  ||  ||  ||  || 
|-
| 50 || June 5 || @Tigers ||  ||  ||  ||  ||  || 
|-
| 51 || June 6 || @Tigers ||  ||  ||  ||  ||  || 
|-
| 52 || June 7 || @Carp ||  ||  ||  ||  ||  || 
|-
| 53 || June 8 || @Carp ||  ||  ||  ||  ||  || 
|-
| 54 || June 10 || Giants ||  ||  ||  ||  ||  || 
|-
| 55 || June 11 || Giants ||  ||  ||  ||  ||  || 
|-
| 56 || June 13 || Swallows ||  ||  ||  ||  ||  || 
|-
| 57 || June 14 || Swallows ||  ||  ||  ||  ||  || 
|-
| 58 || June 16 || @BayStars ||  ||  ||  ||  ||  || 
|-
| 59 || June 17 || @BayStars ||  ||  ||  ||  ||  || 
|-
| 60 || June 20 || @Dragons ||  ||  ||  ||  ||  || 
|-
| 61 || June 21 || @Dragons ||  ||  ||  ||  ||  || 
|-
| 62 || June 26 || Eagles ||  ||  ||  ||  ||  || 
|-
| 63 || June 27 || Eagles ||  ||  ||  ||  ||  || 
|-
| 64 || June 28 || Eagles ||  ||  ||  ||  ||  || 
|-
| 65 || June 30 || @Hawks ||  ||  ||  ||  ||  || 
|-

Player stats

Batting

Pitching

References

Orix Buffaloes
Orix Buffaloes seasons